Mikko Kokkonen (born 18 January 2001) is a Finnish professional ice hockey defenceman who is currently playing with the Toronto Marlies in the American Hockey League (AHL) as a prospect under contract to the Toronto Maple Leafs of the National Hockey League (NHL). He was selected 84th overall by the Maple Leafs in the 2019 NHL Entry Draft.

Playing career
Kokkonen played as a youth within hometown club, Mikkelin Jukurit, before becoming the youngest player in history to play in the Liiga during the 2016–17 season.

Following his selection by the Toronto Maple Leafs in the third-round, 84th overall, in the 2019 NHL Entry Draft, Kokkonen continued his development with Jukurit, appearing in 39 regular season games and collected 3 goals and 10 points in the 2019–20 season.

In his fifth year in the Liiga during the 2020–21 season, Kokkonen was selected as an alternate captain for Jukurit. He made 50 appearances with Mikkelin, adding 1 goal and 10 points.

On 15 April 2021, Kokkonen opted to leave his hometown club, furthering his development by agreeing to a two-year contract with fellow Liiga club, Lahti Pelicans. In order to extend his 2020–21 season, Kokkonen agreed to join the Toronto Maple Leafs AHL affiliate, the Toronto Marlies, for the remainder of the campaign on 16 April 2021.

On 31 March 2022, the Toronto Maple Leafs announced they had signed Kokkonen to a three-year, entry level contract, beginning in the  season.

International play
Kokkonen represented Finland in the 2020 World Junior Ice Hockey Championships as a defender, where he scored two goals in the course of seven games.

Personal life
He is from the city of Mikkeli.

Career statistics

Regular season and playoffs

International

References

External links
 

2001 births
Living people
Finnish ice hockey defencemen
Iisalmen Peli-Karhut players
Imatran Ketterä players
Lahti Pelicans players
Mikkelin Jukurit players
People from Mikkeli
Newfoundland Growlers players
Toronto Maple Leafs draft picks
Toronto Marlies players
Sportspeople from South Savo